The Ohio Bobcats baseball team is a varsity intercollegiate athletic team of Ohio University in Athens, Ohio, United States. The team is a member of the Mid-American Conference East division, which is part of the National Collegiate Athletic Association's Division I. Ohio's first baseball team was fielded in 1892. The team plays its home games at Bob Wren Stadium in Athens, Ohio. The Bobcats are coached by Craig Moore.

Notable former players
Bob Brenly — manager, Arizona Diamondbacks, 2001–2004; 2001 World Series champion
Ernie Kish — outfielder, 1945 Philadelphia Athletics
Rich McKinney — infielder, Chicago White Sox first-round draft pick (1968)
Mike Schmidt — third baseman, Philadelphia Phillies, 1972–1989; 1980 World Series champion; elected to the Baseball Hall of Fame in 1995
Steve Swisher — catcher, Chicago White Sox first-round draft pick (1973)
Jeremie Rehak — umpire, Major League Baseball active (first appearance 2018)
Mickey Briglia — head coach, Rowan University (Glassboro State at the time) from 1964-1988; 2x NCAA Division III World Series Champ (1978, 1979); played third base, All Mid-American Conference 1949-1951

 inductee of the Kermit Blosser Ohio Athletics Hall of Fame

See also
List of NCAA Division I baseball programs

References

External links
 

 
American football teams established in 1892
1892 establishments in Ohio